Aramunt is a locality located in the municipality of Conca de Dalt, in Province of Lleida province, Catalonia, Spain. As of 2020, it has a population of 91.

Geography 
Aramunt is located 110km north-northeast of Lleida.

References

Populated places in the Province of Lleida